Svetlana Rusu (born 9 April 1972, in Roşietici) is a Moldovan politician.

Se has served as a member of the Parliament of Moldova since 2009. In 2010, Svetlana Popa left the Party of Communists of the Republic of Moldova. She was a member of Democratic Party of Moldova and United Moldova Party.

References

External links 
 Deputatul neafiliat Svetlana Rusu a aderat la Partidul Democrat
 Site-ul Parlamentului Republicii Moldova

1972 births
Living people
People from Florești District
Moldovan MPs 2009
Moldovan MPs 2009–2010
Moldovan female MPs
Party of Communists of the Republic of Moldova politicians
Democratic Party of Moldova MPs
21st-century Moldovan women politicians